A druid was a member of the learned class in ancient Celtic cultures. Some were priests, but the title was also used for doctors, law-speakers, and other high-ranking professionals.

Druid may also refer to:

Roles and organizations
 Druid, the highest level of study within the Order of Bards, Ovates and Druids
 Druid, a member of the Ancient Order of Druids, a social service organisation
 Druid, a rank within the Gorsedd of Bards
 Druides, a World War II spy ring, led by Georges Lamarque, that provided V-1 and V-2 Intelligence
 Druidry (modern), a variety of modern spiritual or religious practices, appealing to perceived aspects of ancient Druidic practice

Arts, entertainment, and media
 Henry Hall Dixon (1822–1870) or The Druid, English lawyer and sporting journalist
 Druid (band), a British progressive rock band from the late 1970s
 Druid (character class), a character that represents a magical priest of nature in role-playing games 
Druid (Dungeons & Dragons), a character class in Dungeons & Dragons
 Druid (video game), a computer game for the Amstrad CPC, Commodore 64, and ZX Spectrum
 Druid Theatre Company, a theatre company in Galway, Ireland
 Druids (film), a 2001 film about Gallic druids resisting the Roman armies
 Shannara Druids, an order of historians, philosophers, magic-users, teachers and researchers in the Shannara series of fantasy novels by Terry Brooks
 The Druid King, a 2003 historical novel by American novelist Norman Spinrad
 The Druids of Stonehenge (band), a 1960s American band based in New York City

Other uses
 Druid, Denbighshire, Wales
 Druid (open-source data store), also called Apache Druid
 Druid, in software, another name for a wizard user interface function that leads a user through a series of steps
 Druids, a hairpin bend at Brands Hatch racetrack, England
 USS Druid (SP-321), a United States Navy patrol vessel in commission from 1917 to 1919
 Aedia funesta or the druid, a moth of the family Erebidae
 Druid High School, defunct high school in Alabama, United States